Joe Worrall may refer to:

 Joe Worrall (referee) (born 1945), English football referee
 Joe Worrall (footballer) (born 1997), English footballer